The 2022 Empress's Cup is the 44th season of the Japanese women's football main cup competition.  All the non-relegated teams from the 1st and 2nd division of the 2021 Nadeshiko League (except for Tsukuba FC) automatically qualified to the first and second round (allocated to Nadeshiko League Top 3), while all 11 teams from the 2022–23 WE League earned an automatic entry to the Round of 16.

Calendar and format 
Below are the dates for each round as given by the official schedule:

Participating clubs

First round

Second round

Third round

Round of 16

Quarter-finals

Semi-finals

Final

Top scorers
. 

Players and clubs displayed in bold are still in the competition.

References 

Empress's Cup
2022 in Japanese women's football